Dr. John A. Scudder House is a historic home located at Washington, Daviess County, Indiana.  It was built about 1861, and is a one-story, Second Empire style frame dwelling with a slate mansard roof.  It is sheathed in weatherboard and rests on a brick foundation.  It was remodeled about 1922 to add a sunroom and porch.

It was added to the National Register of Historic Places in 1995.

References

Washington, Indiana
Houses on the National Register of Historic Places in Indiana
Second Empire architecture in Indiana
Houses completed in 1861
Houses in Daviess County, Indiana
National Register of Historic Places in Daviess County, Indiana